Chris Tranchell (born Christopher Peter John Small, 13 April 1941) is a British actor, best known for his role in the television drama Survivors as Paul Pitman.

He also appeared in three different Doctor Who serials: The Massacre of St Bartholomew's Eve in 1966, The Faceless Ones in 1967 and The Invasion of Time in 1978. His other credits include Z-Cars, The Onedin Line, The New Avengers and Play School.
Theatre work includes Thomas Malory’s Morte D'Arthur at the Lyric Hammersmith in the roles of Merlin and Pelles.

Filmography
Battle of Britain (1969) - 'A' Station Pilot (uncredited)

References

External links
 

1941 births
Living people
English male television actors
BBC television presenters